The Arizona Health Care Cost Containment System (AHCCCS, pronounced “access”) is the state agency that administers Arizona’s Medicaid program. Medicaid was created to provide healthcare to individuals who qualify by financial (and, for some programs, medical) need. The $14.6 billion dollar program covers the behavioral and physical health care services for more than 1.9 million Arizonans. In 2019, AHCCCS covers approximately 48% of Arizona’s children and 54% of babies born in the state.

In 2010, the Affordable Care Act (ACA) gave states the option to expand Medicaid eligibility to individuals who earn up to 133% of the Federal Poverty Level (FPL). On January 1, 2014, Arizona expanded Medicaid under the ACA for three population categories: children ages 6 - 18 up to 133%  FPL; childless adults to 100% FPL; and adults up to 133% FPL. See more eligibility requirements.  

Medicaid was adopted in 1965 as a joint federal and state program with oversight from the federal Centers for Medicare and Medicaid Services (CMS). In October 1982, Arizona became the last state in the nation to add a Medicaid program under Title XIX, but the first state to implement a mandatory managed care program for the majority of Medicaid members. For most AHCCCS programs, as of 2019,  the federal government funds approximately 74% of AHCCCS expenditures, while the state funds the remaining amount through the General Fund and other funding sources.

Managed Care vs. Fee-for-Service 
In the traditional Medicaid payment model, called Fee-for-Service, states contract directly with health care providers in order to render services. Medicaid directly pays each provider for the services rendered. In Arizona, approximately 16 percent of members use Fee-for-Service health care.  

The Mandatory Managed Care model  is a public-private partnership where the state contracts with private and non-profit managed care organizations (MCOs) who are the health insurance providers for Medicaid beneficiaries. The MCOs use their market leverage to negotiate rates with their own network of providers. Instead of paying for each service rendered, as the Fee for Service model dictates, AHCCCS pays a monthly capitated rate to the MCOs. Managed care is proven to be an efficient and cost effective Medicaid delivery system.

Behavioral Health History 
In 1990, AHCCCS phased in mental health services and behavioral health coverage in response to federal requirements. This began with coverage of seriously emotionally disabled children under the age of 18 who require residential care. Over the next five years, behavioral health coverage was extended to all Medicaid eligible persons. 

Since 1989, AHCCCS has worked to integrate physical and behavioral health care services across its various programs. From the very beginning of the Arizona Long Term Care System (ALTCS), services have been integrated. Members who are eligible for Children’s Rehabilitative Services have received integrated health care services since 2013, and members with a designation of Serious Mental Illness (SMI) were fully integrated in Maricopa County in April 2014. SMI members residing in remainder of the state's counties, known as Greater Arizona, became fully integrated in October 2015. Services for American Indian members in the American Indian Health Program (AIHP) were integrated in 2016. On October 1, 2018, AHCCCS took the largest step toward eliminating fragmentation in the system by moving 1.5 million members into integrated AHCCCS Complete Care (ACC) health care plans. As of 2019, 98 percent of AHCCCS members are enrolled in integrated health care plans.

Health Care Coverage for Arizona Residents 
AHCCCS Complete Care (ACC) health plans cover approximately 1.5 million AHCCCS members. Members choose from up to seven health plans in their geographic service area. ACC plans offer fully integrated behavioral and physical health services. 

The Arizona Long Term Care System (ALTCS) provides long term care for people who are elderly or who have physical or developmental disabilities, and require institutional level of care. Applicants must meet specific medical and financial eligibility requirements.

ALTCS members with additional intellectual and developmental disabilities receive long term care services through the Department of Economic Security Developmental Disabilities Division (DES/DDD), and integrated physical and behavioral health care through DES/DDD contracted health plans. 

As of 2019, three Regional Behavioral Health Authorities (RBHAs, pronounced “ree-bahs”) serve Arizona, with one RBHA in each geographical region. RBHAs primarily provide integrated healthcare services to AHCCCS members with Serious Mental Illness (SMI) designation. RBHAs also oversee statewide crisis services and other grant and state funded services. Additionally, AHCCCS contracts with five Tribal Regional Behavioral Health Authorities (TRBHA), which provides behavioral health services to some tribal nations. 

Children who are in the state foster care system receive physical health services through the Comprehensive Medical and Dental Program (CMDP), and behavioral health services through RBHAs. Health plan integration is planned to begin on 10/1/2020. 

American Indians/Alaska Natives who are eligible for Medicaid have the choice of enrolling in an AHCCCS Complete Care plan (ACC), or enrolling with the American Indian Health Program (AIHP). AIHP is administered by AHCCCS as a fee-for-service model. Federal mandate guarantees that American Indians have the option of fee-for-service or managed care health plans. 

Children whose parents do not meet the financial eligibility requirements for AHCCCS may qualify for the federal Children’s Health Insurance Program (CHIP), known as KidsCare in Arizona. KidsCare is comprehensive health insurance for children up to age 19, whose parents earn under 200% FPL. Premiums range in cost, depending on the number of children enrolled per family.

How to Apply 
Apply for AHCCCS health care coverage online at healthearizonaplus.gov. Arizona residents with a need for institutional levels of care may apply for ALTCS coverage, by contacting a local ALTCS office, or calling toll free at 888-621-6880.

External links 

 Official AHCCCS website
 Arizona Health Care Freedom Act was conceived by Dr. Eric Novack in 2006

Healthcare in Arizona
Medicare and Medicaid (United States)